Hāshim ibn Fulaytah al-Ḥasanī al-‘Alawī (d. 1155) was the fourth Emir of Mecca from the sharifian dynasty of the Hawashim. He succeeded his father Fulaytah after the latter's death in 1133. He died in late 549 AH (1155) and was succeeded by his son Qasim.

Sources 

Year of birth missing
1155 deaths
12th-century Arabs
Sharifs of Mecca
History of Mecca